This is a list of Bethune-Cookman University alumni. Bethune-Cookman University is a historically black university located in Daytona Beach, Florida.

Business

Marc Vanja Mišanović (Class of 2013) co-founded a nation-wide software company serving mostly independent restaurants.

Community service and civil rights

Education

Entertainment

Modeling

Politics

Athletics

 Kevin Bradshaw, NCAA basketball record-holder for points in a single game, player in the Israeli Basketball Premier League

References

Bethune-Cookman University alumni